Alfred Noroton Phillips, Jr. (April 23, 1894 – January 18, 1970) was a Democratic member of the United States House of Representatives from Connecticut's 4th congressional district and mayor of Stamford, Connecticut from 1923 to 1924, from 1927 to 1928, and from 1935 to 1936.

Biography
Born in Darien, Connecticut, Phillips attended the public schools, Betts Academy, Stamford, Connecticut, and Hotchkiss School, Lakeville, Connecticut.  He graduated from Yale University in 1917. At Yale, he was an editor of campus humor magazine The Yale Record. During the First World War, he served as a first lieutenant in the Field Artillery, United States Army, in 1917 and 1918, with overseas service.  He moved to Stamford, Connecticut, in 1918.  He served as major in the Connecticut National Guard Reserve 1928-1933.  He was employed with the Charles H. Phillips Chemical Co. from early youth until 1923, and as publisher of a newspaper in Darien after 1922.  He served as mayor of Stamford in 1923 and 1924, in 1927 and 1928, and 1935 and 1936. He was commander of the American Legion of Connecticut in 1919.  He served as member of the Democratic State Central committee.

Phillips was elected as a Democrat to the Seventy-fifth Congress (January 3, 1937 – January 3, 1939).  He was an unsuccessful candidate for reelection in 1938 to the Seventy-sixth Congress.  He resumed his publishing business in Darien, Connecticut, and the management of his dairy farm in Cecilton, Maryland.  He was commissioned as a captain, Military Police, United States Army, and served from July 17, 1942, to August 16, 1944, with service in North Africa.  He died in Stamford, Connecticut, January 18, 1970.  He was interred in St. Stephen's Cemetery, Earleville, Maryland.

See also

References

External links 

1894 births
1970 deaths
United States Army personnel of World War I
United States Army personnel of World War II
Hotchkiss School alumni
People from Darien, Connecticut
Mayors of Stamford, Connecticut
United States Army officers
Yale University alumni
Democratic Party members of the United States House of Representatives from Connecticut
20th-century American politicians